Jack B. Stirling, sometimes misspelled at "Sterling" (November 16, 1917 – September 1970) was an American professional basketball player. He played college basketball for Geneva College. He then played in the National Basketball League for the Warren Penns and Pittsburgh Pirates. Stirling averaged 2.2 points per game in his career.

References

1917 births
1970 deaths
American men's basketball players
Basketball players from Pennsylvania
Centers (basketball)
Geneva Golden Tornadoes men's basketball players
Pittsburgh Pirates (NBL) players
Warren Penns players